Monise Laafai is a Tuvaluan politician and businessman.

He stood for Parliament for the first time at the 2010 general election, and was elected MP for the constituency of Nanumaga. He supported Maatia Toafa's successful bid for the premiership, and was subsequently appointed to Cabinet, as Minister of Finance. He lost office just three months later, when Toafa's government was brought down by a motion of no confidence.

Laafai is also General Manager of the Tuvalu Co-operative Society, a position he has held since the late 1990s. He was also chef de mission of the Tuvaluan delegation to the 2007 Pacific Games in Samoa.

On 5 August 2013 Monise Laafai was appointed Minister for Communications and Transport; and served as the minister during the Sopoaga Ministry.

He was re-elected in the 2019 general election.

References

Finance Ministers of Tuvalu
Government ministers of Tuvalu
Members of the Parliament of Tuvalu
People from Nanumanga
Living people
Year of birth missing (living people)